Leptotrichia goodfellowii is a Gram-negative, non-spore-forming and non-motile bacterium from the genus of Leptotrichia which has been isolated from human blood of an endocarditis patient.

References

Fusobacteriota
Bacteria described in 2004